The Helena and Aurora Range  or Bungalbin is a range of mountains and hills in the Goldfields-Esperance region of Western Australia,  north-east of Southern Cross and  north-east of Koolyanobbing within the Shire of Yilgarn. The range is the largest of six banded ironstone ranges that are situated within the Coolgardie IBRA region.

The traditional owners of the area are of the Kaprun peoples who speak the Kalaamaya language. The area is home to at least 16 Aboriginal sacred sites.

The area is rich in minerals and was considered as a possible site for an Iron ore mine. In 2017, a proposal to develop the area by Mineral Resources was found to be unacceptable by the Environmental Protection Authority then appealed and rejected by an independent appeals convener. The decision was supported by the state's environment minister Stephen Dawson.

The first stage of the creation of the Helena and Aurora Range National Park was completed in February 2021 by Environment minister Stephen Dawson.

References

Mountains of Western Australia
Great Western Woodlands
Goldfields-Esperance
Coolgardie woodlands